Sakis Zarzopoulos (born 15 December 1949) is a Greek former professional footballer who played as a defender.

Club career
Zarzopoulos began football at a professional level in 1969 at his hometown club of Panserraikos, where he quickly established himself as a key player in their defensive line. Zarzopoulos competed in all positions of defense as he possessed to both the strength and agility required by the positions of centrer backs, as well as the technical ability and speed required by the positions of side backs with his physical and technical skills gave him the opportunity to score several times. In the summer of 1973, he aroused the interest of Olympiacos and AEK Athens. In the end AEK managed to get his signature, offering to acquire, apart from him, his teammate at Panserraikos, Spyros Stefanidis.

In the yellow-blacks he was treated as the solution to cover any defensive gap that appeared in the squad. On 29 October 1973 he scored a brace that helped AEK get the victory by 1–2 over Ethnikos Piraeus at Karaiskakis Stadium. He was a part of the squad that reached to the semi-finals of the UEFA Cup in the 1977. In the summer of 1977 Zarzopoulos left AEK, he continued his career at OFI for a season, before he returned to Panserraikos. In the summer of 1979, after the club from Serres was relegated to the second division and Zarzopoulos ended his career.

Managerial career
After the end of his career as a footballer, he became involved in coaching, usually working in teams in the local division of Serres, with the last club of his career being Visaltikos Nigritas.

Honours

Panserraikos
Beta Ethniki: 1971–72

References

1949 births
Living people
Greek footballers
Super League Greece players
Panserraikos F.C. players
AEK Athens F.C. players
OFI Crete F.C. players
Association football defenders
Footballers from Serres